Hue is a 2016 puzzle-platform game designed by Henry Hoffman and Dan Da Rocha, developed by Fiddlesticks, and published by Curve Digital. The game was released on August 30, 2016 for Microsoft Windows, PlayStation 4, and Xbox One, and later released on November 29, 2016 for PlayStation Vita. It was released for Nintendo Switch on June 6, 2019. There were further releases for iOS on January 25, 2020 and Android on April 22, 2020.

Gameplay 
The plot revolves around the protagonist, Hue, searching for his mother (voiced by Anna Acton) who turned an 'impossible colour' due to the fracturing of the Annular Spectrum, a ring that she developed to allow perception and alteration of colour. During this journey, the player searches through a black-and-white world, collecting shards of the Annular Spectrum, which will allow the player to make obstacles disappear by switching to the corresponding colour on the colour wheel. This in turn reveals new pathways and puzzles. As the player progresses, collecting more shards and unlocking more colours, the game's difficulty increases with more colours being needed to complete puzzles. The eight colours are unlocked in the following order: aqua, purple, orange, pink, blue, red, yellow, and green.

Reception 

Hue received "generally favorable" reviews on Metacritic.

References

External links 
 

2016 video games
Puzzle-platform games
Linux games
MacOS games
Nintendo Switch games
PlayStation 4 games
PlayStation Vita games
Xbox One games
Single-player video games
Video games developed in the United Kingdom
Windows games
Curve Games games